ΚΕΦΑΛΗΞΘ (commonly known as Psalm 69: The Way to Succeed and the Way to Suck Eggs or simply Psalm 69) is the fifth studio album by American industrial metal band Ministry, released on July 14, 1992, by Sire Records. It was produced by frontman Al Jourgensen and bassist Paul Barker, and was recorded from March 1991 to May 1992 in Chicago, Illinois and Lake Geneva, Wisconsin. The album's title, initially intended to be The Tapes of Wrath, ended up being derived from Aleister Crowley's The Book of Lies.

Psalm 69 features elements of speed metal, rockabilly, and psychobilly, with lyrics exploring social, political, and religious topics. With much anticipation following the success of Ministry's previous album The Mind Is a Terrible Thing to Taste (1989), pressures on the band were said to be high, in addition to the growing substance abuse of several members and worsening relationships between them. It was also the first time Mike Scaccia had been significantly involved in a Ministry album, after appearing on tours in support of The Mind....

Preceded by lead single "Jesus Built My Hotrod", Psalm 69 was a critical and commercial success upon its release, peaking at number 27 on the US Billboard 200 and number 33 on the UK Albums Chart. It was supported by two more singles: "N.W.O." and "Just One Fix", with accompanying music videos directed by Peter Christopherson. Psalm 69 is considered to be Ministry's most successful album, having been certified gold in Canada and Australia, and platinum in the US. Following its release, Ministry joined the second annual Lollapalooza tour before commencing a tour through Europe and the US; "N.W.O.", "Just One Fix", and the title track have become permanent features of the band's live setlist. "N.W.O." was nominated for the Best Metal Performance at the 35th Annual Grammy Awards.

Background and recording

In March 1991, following the conclusion of the year-long tour in support of Revolting Cocks album Beers, Steers, and Queers, Al Jourgensen returned with his bandmates at Chicago Trax! studios, to work on Ministry's next major release. Jourgensen claimed that the record company Warner Bros. Records (to which Ministry were signed via their subsidiary, Sire Records) initially gave the band an enormous budget expecting a follow-up to The Mind... to become a big hit compared with Michael Jackson's album Thriller; actually, Jourgensen, as he claimed in 2013, with his then wife Patty (née Marsh) and guitarist Mike Scaccia spent most of the budget on drugs, paying $1,000 per day. Meanwhile, the first Lollapalooza tour had arrived in Chicago in early August 1991. Jourgensen went backstage attending a show by the band Butthole Surfers. After the gig, he had invited Butthole Surfers' singer Gibby Haynes to Chicago Trax! to record what became the vocals and spoken word parts for the song "Jesus Built My Hotrod". While finishing "Jesus Built My Hotrod", Jourgensen was contacted by Sire/Warner Bros. executives, who asked if he had any completed material. Jourgensen sent them "Jesus Built My Hotrod" since it was the only song recorded by this time. While the label was not happy with just having "Jesus Built My Hotrod", Jourgensen told them either to give another advance for further work or sign the band off. The label was doubtful if the band would record anything else, but decided to release "Jesus Built My Hotrod"; following its success, they gave the band necessary budget, with the condition that the band would eventually finish the record.

Besides drug problems, there was also growing animosity between the band's members, divided into two groups: while one group included Jourgensen and Scaccia, another—dubbed "the Book Club" by Jourgensen—included bassist Paul Barker, drummer Bill Rieflin and guest/live singer Chris Connelly. Jourgensen claimed that he and Scaccia added their parts separately from Barker, Rieflin and Connelly; once Jourgensen and Scaccia would come in, they erased about 80 percent of what the Book Club associates did.

The last songs included for the album, the instrumental tracks "Corrosion" and "Grace", were written mainly by Barker and recorded in February–March 1992; the album's last session was held on May 7, 1992. Over 15 months were spent on the recording, however, only nine of about 30 songs made its way onto the final cut, with the rest being distributed to side projects.

Etymology
The title of the album is linked to chapter 69 of The Book of Lies, a written work of Aleister Crowley, where he uses the expression "The way to succeed and the way to suck eggs" as a pun for the 69 sex position ("suck seed" and "suck eggs"). Moreover, Crowley titled the chapter ΚΕΦΑΛΗΞΘ (which translates literally as "shrugged" and contains the sound ΛΗΞ "licks") but has a second meaning as a compound of Greek κεφαλη ("head") and Ξ Θ (an encoded alphabetic reference to "69") which both have slang meanings in English for sexual acts.

Subsequent to the album's release, Ministry put multiple references to the number 69 in future albums. For example, the albums Dark Side of the Spoon and Houses of the Molé both have hidden tracks at track #69. A further reference to the number was exhibited on Houses of the Mole with a hidden track at #23 titled "Psalm 23", one third of 69.

Cover art
The cover art depicts a silhouette of an angel surrounded by clocks and other miscellaneous objects as border icons. It was designed by photographer Paul Elledge who conceived the layout after Jourgensen handed him a copy of Aleister Crowley's 1918 The Book of Lies. The final cover image was a triple exposure of three images on one piece of film. The angel was a model from Chicago's Art Institute, who was wearing angel wings crafted by the artist's wife at the time. It took Elledge a week to complete the cover art.

Reception

Psalm 69 was ranked No. 80 on the Rolling Stone's "Top 100 Greatest Metal Albums of All Time" list, with author Suzy Exposito concluding that "the result of the album was a manic drag race into a swampy hellmouth of thrash Americana – and it worked". The album was also included in the book 1001 Albums You Must Hear Before You Die.

Accolades
"N.W.O." was nominated for the Grammy Award for Best Metal Performance at the Grammy Awards of 1993, but lost to Nine Inch Nails' "Wish".

Legacy
Video game composer Frank Klepacki cited Psalm 69 album as a primary influence in creating the soundtrack for the 1995 video game Command & Conquer.

Track listing
All songs credited to Ministry, except noted. Writing credits taken from ASCAP and BMI databases.

Charts and certifications

Album

Singles

Certifications

Personnel
Credits adapted from the liner notes of the album.

Ministry
Al Jourgensen – vocals , guitars, keyboards, production
Paul Barker – bass, programming, vocals, production

Additional musicians
William Rieflin – drums
Mike Scaccia – guitar
Michael Balch – keyboards, programming
Howie Beno – programming
Louis Svitek – guitar
Gibby Haynes – vocals and lyrics 

Production
Jeff "Critter" Newell – engineer
Paul Manno – engineer
Tom Baker – mastering
Paul Elledge – artwork
Dale Lavi – photography
"Thirst" – artwork assistant

Notes

References

Citations

Bibliography

External links
 ΚΕΦΑΛΗΞΘ's promotion at the July 25, 1992 [Vol. 104, No. 30] issue of Billboard via Google Books.
 .

1992 albums
Ministry (band) albums
Albums produced by Al Jourgensen
Sire Records albums
Warner Records albums